Idit Silman (born 27 October 1980) is an Israeli politician who currently serves as the Minister of Environmental Protection. Silman previously served as a member of the Knesset for Likud from 2022 to 2023, for Yamina from 2021 to 2022, and for the Union of Right-Wing Parties in 2019. She was the parliamentary whip of the coalition from 2021, until her resignation from the coalition on 6 April 2022, after which she maintained her Knesset seat and shifted the balance of power between coalition and opposition.

Early life
Idit Silman was born in Rehovot to immigrant Moroccan Jewish parents from Morocco, and was educated at Ulpana Tzfira and the Wingate Institute. She worked in marketing in the health sector. She is married, and has three children.

Political career
She was an activist with Mafdal since her youth, and continued in the Jewish Home into which Mafdal was merged, where she was chosen for the female spot on the party list for the April 2019 Knesset elections. When the party joined the Union of the Right-Wing Parties alliance, she was placed fifth on its list, going on to enter the Knesset as the alliance won five seats.

Silman was given the eighth slot on the Yamina list (a joint ticket of the New Right, The Jewish Home, and National Union) for the elections to the 22nd Knesset. However Yamina won only seven seats, and Silman lost her seat in the Knesset.

Silman left the Jewish Home for the New Right on 15 January 2020, and was placed in the seventh slot on the Yamina list the same day when the alliance was re-established for the 2020 Israeli legislative election.

She was placed in the eighth slot of the Yamina list ahead of the 2021 Israeli legislative election. She became an MK after Alon Davidi resigned from the Yamina list before being sworn in.

On 6 April 2022, Silman resigned from the coalition, causing the governing coalition of Prime Minister Naftali Bennett to lose its majority in the Knesset, and raising the possibility of new elections in Israel for the fifth time in four years. Prime Minister Bennett claimed that Silman had been "persecuted for months" by supporters of Likud party leader and opposition leader Benjamin Netanyahu "at the most horrific level" until she "broke" and left the coalition. Silman herself, however, referenced the fact that the Minister of Health, Nitzan Horowitz, citing a supreme court decision, instructed hospitals to allow visitors to enter with chametz (leavened bread) during Passover. Possessing chametz during Passover is forbidden under Jewish law. On 2 May, in her first interview since her resignation from the coalition, Silman said that she made the move due to various religion-related actions of the coalition. Specifically, she referenced the upcoming reforms in kashrut-oversight authorities, changes in authorizations to conduct giyur (conversion to Judaism), discussions about creating a section for the non-Orthodox in the Western Wall Plaza, and the Treasury Minister's decision to limit financial support of poor families whose parents neither work, nor engage in studies with the intention of acquiring a profession. This last category is seen by some as a way to coerce Haredim to reduce their religious learning studies and enter the secular world.

Silman resigned from the Knesset on 11 September and was replaced by Orna Starkmann. She was later given the 16th spot on the Likud's list ahead of the 2022 election. Following the results Silman returned for an additional term as an MK with Likud winning 32 seats. 

On 29 December 2022, Silman was appointed Environmental Protection Minister by Benjamin Netanyahu during the formation of the thirty-seventh government of Israel. She resigned from the Knesset on 7 January 2023 as part of the Norwegian Law.

References

External links

1980 births
Living people
21st-century Israeli women politicians
Israeli Orthodox Jews
Members of the 21st Knesset (2019)
Members of the 24th Knesset (2021–2022)
Members of the 25th Knesset (2022–)
Likud politicians
People from Rehovot
The Jewish Home politicians
Women members of the Knesset
Yamina politicians